Eduardo Cuervo  (born August 2, 1977, in Guadalajara, Jalisco) is a Mexican actor. He is best known for his participation in various telenovelas produced by Televisa, such as Abrázame muy fuerte, Amigas y Rivales, and Mujer de Madera.

Career 

In 2006, he started working in Telemundo produced serials such as Tierra de Pasiones, shot in Miami, FL, and in 2007 he was part of the young cast of Telemundo's upcoming Pecados Ajenos.

References 

1977 births
Mexican male telenovela actors
Male actors from Guadalajara, Jalisco
Living people
Mexican expatriates in the United States